Shepler is a surname. Notable people with the surname include:

Dwight Shepler (1905–1974), American painter and United States Navy officer
Matthias Shepler (1790–1863), American politician

See also
Shepler's Ferry, a ferry company of Mackinac Island, Michigan, United States